As-Suwayda or Al-Suwayda Governorate ( / ALA-LC: Muḥāfaẓat as-Suwaydā’) is one of the fourteen governorates (provinces) of Syria. It is the southernmost governorate and has an area of 5,550 km² and forms part of the historic Hawran region. Its capital and major city is al-Suwayda. 

Geographically the governorate comprises almost all of Jabal al-Druze, the eastern part of Lejah, and a part of the arid eastern steppe of Harrat al-Shamah.

Most of As-Suwayda inhabitants work in agriculture, planting grapes, apple, olive, and wheat in general. In addition, there are four clearly demarcated seasons (winter, spring, summer, and fall) which gives As-Suwayda nice weather and beautiful natural sites.
As-Suwayda contains many archaeological sites.

Demographics and population

The governorate has a population of about 375,000 inhabitants (est. 2011).
It is the only governorate in Syria that has a Druze majority. There is also a sizable Eastern Orthodox minority, and a small Muslim refugee community from mainly Daraa Governorate as well as other parts of Syria.

In the 1980s Druze made up 87.6% of the population, Christians (mostly Greek Orthodox) 11% and Sunni Muslims 2%. In 2010, the As-Suwayda governorate has a population of about 375,000 inhabitants, Druze made up 90%, Christians 7% and Sunni Muslims 3%. Due to low birth and high emigration rates, Christians proportion in As-Suwayda had declined.

Most of the inhabitants live in the western parts of the governorate, especially on the western slopes of Jabal ad-Duruz. Only nomadic Bedouin tribes live in the barren region of Harrat al-Shamah.

Districts

The governorate is divided into three districts (manatiq). The districts are further divided into 12 sub-districts (nawahi):

 As-Suwayda District (3 sub-districts)
 As-Suwayda Subdistrict
 Al-Mazraa Subdistrict
 Al-Mushannaf Subdistrict

 Salkhad District (5 sub-districts)
 Salkhad Subdistrict
 Al-Qrayya Subdistrict
 Al-Ghariyah Subdistrict
 Thaybin Subdistrict
 Malah Subdistrict

 Shahba District (4 sub-districts)
 Shahba Subdistrict
 Shaqqa Subdistrict
 Al-Ariqah Subdistrict
 Al-Surah al-Saghirah Subdistrict

Cities, towns and villages

The governorate contains 3 cities, 124 villages, and 36 hamlets.

Cities
Shahba
Al-Suwayda
Salkhad

Villages

Shaqqa 
Al-Ajailat
Al-Ghariyah
Al-Kefr
Al-Qurayya
Ariqah
Ar-Raha
Braiki
Dair Allaban
Dama
Hobran
Kafr Alluhuf
Lahetha
Msad
Murduk
Qanawat
Rimet Alluhuf
Rimet Hazem
Samma Al-baradan
Samma Al-hanidat
Shaniri
Shbeki
Walgha

See also 
Druze in Syria

References

 
Governorates of Syria